Alden as both a given name and a surname originated in the Old English language. The name can derive from Ealdwine (meaning "old friend") or (in the Scottish Borders) from Healfdene.

People with the surname
 Alvin Alden (1818–1882), American politician
 Blanche Ray Alden (1870–1934), American musician and composer
 Charles Henry Alden (1836–1906), American military officer
 Chris Alden, American entrepreneur
 Christopher Alden (director) (born 1944), American theatre director
 Cynthia May Alden (1862–1931), American journalist, author, and municipal employee
 David Alden (born 1949), American theatre and film director
 Edward Alden (born 1961), American-Canadian journalist and policy analyst
 Emily Gilmore Alden (1834–1914), American author and educator
 George I. Alden (1843–1926), American mechanical engineer and educator
 Ginger Alden, American actress and model
 Harold Alden (1890–1964), American astronomer
 Henry Mills Alden (1836–1919), American author and publication editor
 Howard Alden (born 1958), American jazz guitarist
 Ichabod Alden (1739–1778), American military officer
 Isabella Macdonald Alden (1841–1930), American author
 James Alden Jr. (1810–1877), American military officer
 Jerome Alden (1921–1997), American playwright, father of Christopher Alden and David Alden
 John Alden ( 1598–1687), one of the Pilgrims on the Mayflower
 John Alden (sailor) ( 1626–1702), American military officer, son of John Alden and Priscilla Alden
 John Richard Alden (1908–1991), American historian
 Joseph Alden (1807–1885), American scholar, educator, and author
 Kay Alden (born 1946), American television writer
 Lucy Morris Chaffee Alden (1836–1912), American author, educator, and hymn writer
 Mary Alden (1883–1946), American actress
 Norman Alden (1924–2012), American actor
 Priscilla Alden ( 1602–1685), one of the Pilgrims on the Mayflower, wife of John Alden and mother of John Alden Jr.
 Raymond Macdonald Alden (1873–1924), American scholar and educator
 Raymond W. Alden III, American educator and academic administrator
 Roy Alden (1863–1937), American newspaper editor and politician
 Timothy Alden (1771–1839)), American clergyman and academic administrator
 Timothy Alden (politician) (born 1991), Maltese politician
 Scott Alden (1907–1977), American law enforcement official, lawyer, college professor, and college athletics head coach
 Vernon Roger Alden, American academic administrator
 William L. Alden (1837–1908), American journalist and writer

People with the given name
Alden Aaroe (1918–1993), American broadcast journalist and announcer
 Alden Anderson (1867–1944), American politician
 Alden G. Barber (1919–2003), American scouting executive
 Alden Brock ( 2002–2015), American flooding victim
 Alden Brown (born 1957), also known as Peter North, Canadian pornographic actor, film director, and film producer
 Alden Carter (born 1947), American author
 Alden W. Clausen (1923–2013), American businessman
 Alden Partridge Colvocoresses (1918–2007), American military officer and cartographer
 Alden B. Dow (1904–1983), American architect
 Alden Ehrenreich (born 1989), American actor
 Alden Jenks (born 1940), American composer
 Alden Knipe (1870–1950), American football player and coach
 Alden McLaughlin (born 1961), Cayman Islands politician
 Alden H. Miller (1906–1965), American ornithologist, zoologist, and museum director
 Alden Nowlan (1933–1983), Canadian poet, novelist, playwright, and journalist
 Alden Partridge (1785–1854), American author, legislator, military officer, and surveyor
 Alden Pasche (1910–1986), American basketball coach
 Alden Penner (born 1983), Canadian musician, songwriter, and businessman
 Alden Richards (born 1992), Filipino actor, host, model, and recording artist
 Alden Roche (born 1945), American football player
 Alden Sanborn (1899–1991), American rower
 Alden Thompson, American theologian
 Alden Whitman (1913–1990), American journalist

People with the middle name
 Don Alden Adams (born 1925), American clergyman
 Neil Alden Armstrong (1930–2012), American naval officer, test pilot, astronaut, and educator
 Vaughan Alden Bass, American painter
 Benjamin Alden Bidlack (1804–1849), American politician
 Charles Alden Black (1919–2005), American businessman, aquaculturalist, and oceanographer
 John Alden Carpenter (1876–1951), American composer
 Henry Alden Clark (1850–1944), American politician
 Stuart Alden Cook (born 1945), American musician
 John Alden Dix (1860–1928), American politician
 Walter Alden Dyer (1878–1943), American author and journalist
 John Alden Mason (1885–1967), American anthropologist, linguist, and curator
 Daniel Alden Reed (1875–1959), American football player, American football coach, and politician
 Phil Alden Robinson (born 1950), American film director and screenwriter
 William Alden Smith (1859–1932), American politician
 Elizabeth Alden Stam (1906–1934), American religious missionary
 J. Alden Weir (1852–1919), American painter
 Harold Alden Wheeler (1903–1996), American engineer

Fictional people
 Alden (The Walking Dead), a character in the horror drama television series The Walking Dead
 The Alden family, four siblings of which are the main characters of The Boxcar Children novel series
 The Alden family, one of the two main families portrayed in the American soap opera Loving
 James Alden, the main character in the 1931 American film The Millionaire
 Oliver Alden, the main character in the novel The Last Puritan
 Rev. Robert Alden, a character in the American television drama series Little House on the Prairie
 Roberta Alden, a character in the novel An American Tragedy
 Terri Alden, a character in the American television sitcom series Three's Company
 Thomas and Amy Alden, father and daughter that are main characters in the American film Fly Away Home
 Alden Jones, a character in the Canadian television cartoon series Braceface
 Alden Pyle, a character in the novel The Quiet American
 Alden, a secondary main villain and boss from the game inFamous
Alden Dedrick Vacker, a character in the Keeper Of The Lost Cities book series by Shannon Messenger
Alden Carruthers, a character from the game Red Dead Redemption 2

Aldén surname
Aldén is a nearly homonymic surname that seems to be of Swedish or other Scandinavian origin, apparently unrelated to the English Alden surname.  Among people with the Aldén surname are:

 Sebastian Aldén (born 1985), Swedish motorcycle racer
 Sonja Aldén (born 1977), English-Swedish singer-songwriter

See also
 Alden (disambiguation)

English-language surnames
Lists of people by surname
de:Alden
io:Alden
pl:Alden
pt:Alden